Ankit Kushwah (born 20 April 1992) is an Indian cricketer who plays for Madhya Pradesh. He made his first-class debut on 6 February 2015 in the 2014–15 Ranji Trophy. He made his Twenty20 debut on 2 January 2016 in the 2015–16 Syed Mushtaq Ali Trophy. He made his List A debut for Madhya Pradesh in the 2016–17 Vijay Hazare Trophy on 3 March 2017.

References

External links
 

1992 births
Living people
Indian cricketers
Madhya Pradesh cricketers
Place of birth missing (living people)